The genus Sericulus of the family Ptilonorhynchidae consists of four spectacularly colored bowerbirds.

All species build an "avenue-type" bower and are found in New Guinea and Australia.

Species

References

 
Bird genera